Truth Decay is an album by T Bone Burnett, released in 1980. It was his first solo release since 1972 and his first as T Bone Burnett.

Reception

In his review, music critic Brett Hartenbach of Allmusic called the album a "modest, passionate gem." and wrote "Burnett delivers a collection of parables, tales, and personal struggles propelled by his strong beliefs and some captivating roots rock... "

Track listing 
All tracks composed by T Bone Burnett; except where indicated

 "Quicksand" – 4:01
 "Talk Talk Talk Talk Talk" – 3:44
 "Boomerang" (Burnett, David Mansfield, Steven Soles) – 4:19
 "Love At First Sight" – 4:15
 "Madison Avenue" – 2:38
 "Driving Wheel" – 3:19
 "Come Home" (Burnett, Mansfield) – 4:33
 "Power Of Love" – 2:55
 "House Of Mirrors" – 3:34
 "Tears Tears Tears" – 2:36
 "Pretty Girls" – 4:08
 "I'm Coming Home" – 4:04

Personnel
T Bone Burnett – vocals, guitar
Steven Soles – guitar, vocals
Turner Stephen Bruton – guitar
David Mansfield – guitar
Jerry McGee – guitar, bass
David Miner – bass
Billy Swan – vocals
K.O. Thomas – piano
David Kemper – drums

Production
Produced by Reggie Fisher
Engineered by Geoff Gillette and Reggie Fisher
Mixed by Larry Hirsch and Reggie Fisher
Mastered by Bernie Grunman and Reggie Fisher

References

T Bone Burnett albums
1980 albums
Takoma Records albums